Steve Roslonek (born September 12, 1971) is an American children's music performer whose band SteveSongs has garnered several awards from parenting organizations, such as the Parents' Choice Award and the iParenting Media Awards. His music is featured on the Miss Lori and Hooper segments of PBS Kids Preschool Destination, where he appears as "Mr. Steve" and performs original songs between other programs.

Prior to his career as a recording artist, Roslonek graduated from Wesleyan University and performed with a professional a cappella group on Martha's Vineyard. After graduation, he worked as a business and technology consultant with Andersen Consulting. He began performing in 1997 and moved to a full-time recording career in 1999. He tours extensively around the country, performing between 200 and 400 concerts in a year.

Roslonek resides with his wife and children in Old Saybrook, Connecticut.

Discography
Morning 'Til Night (1999): Parents' Choice Silver Award
On a Flying Guitar (2000, reissued 2017): Parents' Choice Gold Award
The King, the Mice and the Cheese (2001)
Super Little Man (2003, reissued 2007): Parents' Choice Silver Award
Marvelous Day!: Parents' Choice Gold Award (2006, reissued 2017)
Music Time with SteveSongs, Volume 1: Features songs from his appearances on PBS Kids
Music Time with SteveSongs, Volume 2: Music from his 2010–2011 Appearances on PBS Kids.
Orangutan Van (2012, reissued 2017)

Notes

References

External links
SteveSongs official web site

SteveSongs videos from PBS Kids on YouTube
"Bridge to Terabithia", written by Steve Roslonek and sung by Mariel Ross.
"Bridge to Terabithia"

Living people
American children's musicians
Wesleyan University alumni
Place of birth missing (living people)
1971 births